WKBX is a commercial radio station that broadcasts to the Brunswick and Jacksonville areas on 106.3 FM. The station is licensed in Kingsland to Radio Kings Bay, Inc.. It is branded as KBAY 106.3 and broadcasts a country music format.

External links
KBAY 106.3

KBX
Country radio stations in the United States